Juan Ignacio Díaz (born 26 May 1998) is an Argentine professional footballer who plays as a full-back for Barracas Central, on loan from Estudiantes.

Career
Díaz began with Estudiantes, joining their academy in 2007. Having sat on the bench for the entirety of a 3–0 loss in Primera División away to San Martín on 4 February 2019, Díaz was selected by Leandro Benítez for his professional bow days later in a fixture with Patronato at the Estadio Ciudad de La Plata. He appeared three more times in 2018–19. In August 2020, after not featuring in 2019–20, Díaz was loaned to Primera B Nacional with Agropecuario.

In January 2022, Díaz joined Barracas Central on a one-year loan.

Career statistics
.

References

External links

1998 births
Living people
Footballers from La Plata
Argentine footballers
Association football defenders
Argentine Primera División players
Estudiantes de La Plata footballers
Club Agropecuario Argentino players
Barracas Central players